Lowestoft Town Football Club is a semi-professional football club from Lowestoft, Suffolk, England.

History
The club was established in 1887 as Lowestoft F.C. by a merger of East Suffolk and the original Kirkley, and were renamed Lowestoft Town in 1890. They joined the Norfolk & Suffolk League as founder members in 1897, and won six of the first seven championships, also playing in the North Suffolk League, where they also won six championships in seven seasons. They reached the final of the FA Amateur Cup in 1900, losing the final 5–1 to Bishop Auckland, and also reached the semi-finals in 1902–03, losing in a replay to Oxford City. In the  1926–27 season they reached the first round of the FA Cup the first time, losing 10–1 at Watford. They won the Norfolk & Suffolk League again in 1928–29 and 1930–31.

In 1935 the club merged with another incarnation of Kirkley, and joined the new Eastern Counties League. They shared the first championship with Harwich & Parkeston, before winning it outright in 1937–38. The following season they won the League Cup with a 4–1 win over Colchester Town reserves, and also reached the first round of the FA Cup losing 6–0 at Swindon Town.

They won the League Cup again in 1955, and after turning semi-professional in 1962, dominated the league during the 1960s, winning the championship in 1962–63 and finishing runners-up in 1963–64. They then won four successive championships, before finishing second in 1968–69 and going on to win two more titles in the following seasons, as well as winning the League Cup in 1966, 1967 and 1969. They also reached the first round of the FA Cup in 1966–67, losing 2–1 at Orient, and again the following season, when they lost 1–0 at home to Watford.

However, the club's fortunes then went into decline, although they won the League Cup in 1976, and a league and cup double in 1977–78, a season in which they reached the FA Cup first round again, losing 2–0 at home to Cambridge United.

They won the league again in 2005–06, and in 2008 reached the final of the FA Vase, where they lost 2–1 to Kirkham & Wesham. The following season they won the Premier Division of the Eastern Counties League again, together with the Suffolk Premier Cup, and were promoted to Division One North of the Isthmian League. They won the league at the first attempt to earn promotion to the Premier Division, also reaching the first round of the FA Cup, losing 1–0 at Wrexham. In their first season in the Premier Division they finished fourth and reached the play-off final, where they lost 4–3 at Tonbridge Angels. In 2011–12 the club reached the play-off final again after finishing third, but lost 2–1 to AFC Hornchurch after extra time. The club also reached the final of the Suffolk Premier Cup, in which they defeated Bury Town 4–2. In 2012–13 Lowestoft reached the play-off final for the third consecutive season after finishing as runners-up, this time losing 2–1 at home to Concord Rangers.

After finishing fourth the following season, the club finally earned promotion to the Football Conference North, winning the play-off final at the fourth attempt after beating AFC Hornchurch 3–0. After finishing mid-table in their first season and winning the Suffolk Premier Cup, beating Whitton United 2–1 after extra time, they were relegated from the renamed National League North at the end of the 2015–16 season, although they retained the Premier Cup with a 3–1 win over Leiston. The club were transferred to the Premier Central division of the Southern League at the end of the 2017–18 season as part of the restructuring of the non-League pyramid. In 2021–22 they finished bottom of the Premier Central Division, resulting in relegation to Division One North of the Isthmian League.

Colours and badge
Lowestoft Town's club colours are all blue with white trim and the club's second choice kit, usually when away from home, is all white with blue and yellow trims.

The club badge is the town crest of Lowestoft.

Ground

Lowestoft originally played at the Crown Meadow Athletics Ground, which shared part of the same site as the modern Crown Meadow. In 1889 they moved to a ground in North Denes, but returned to the new Crown Meadow in 1894. It was opened with a match against Lowestoft Harriers on 22 September 1894. In 1922 the club bought the ground from the council for £3,150 after it looked as though the site may be sold for housing. Floodlights were installed in 1964 and a social club built in the same year. The record crowd of 5,000 was set for the FA Cup match against Watford 1967.

In 1988, the pavilion (which was built in 1885) was demolished and part of the site was sold to a developer, with the proceeds funding the building of a new changing room and hospitality block. Today the ground consists of a 466-seat stand with standing areas around the rest of the pitch.

Current squad
 

The Isthmian League does not use a squad numbering system.

Management and coaching staff

Boardroom

Current staff

Honours
Isthmian League
Premier Division play off winners 2013–14
Division One North champions 2009–10
Eastern Counties League
Champions 1935–36 (joint), 1937–38, 1962–63, 1964–65, 1965–66, 1966–67, 1967–68, 1969–70, 1970–71, 1977–78, 2005–06, 2008–09
League Cup winners 1938–39, 1954–55, 1965–66, 1966–67, 1968–69, 1975–76, 1977–78, 1983–84, 2000–01, 2006–07
Norfolk & Suffolk League
Champions 1897–98, 1898–99, 1900–01, 1901–02, 1902–03, 1903–04, 1928–29, 1930–31
North Suffolk League
Champions 1897–98, 1898–99, 1899–1900, 1900–01, 1902–03, 1903–04, 1904–05
Suffolk Premier Cup
Winners 1966–67, 1971–72, 1974–75, 1978–79, 1979–80, 1999–2000, 2000–01, 2004–05, 2005–06, 2008–09, 2011–12, 2014–15, 2015–16
Suffolk Senior Cup
Winners 1902–03, 1922–23, 1923–24, 1925–26, 1931–32, 1935–36, 1946–47, 1947–48, 1948–49, 1955–56
East Anglian Cup
Winners 1929–30, 1970–71, 1977–78

Records
Highest league position: 16th, National League North, 2014–15
Best FA Cup performance: First round, 1926–27, 1938–39, 1966–67, 1967–68, 1977–78, 2009–10
Best FA Trophy performance: Second round, 1971–72
Best FA Vase performance: Runners up, 2007–08
Attendance: 5,000 vs Watford, FA Cup first round, 1967

See also
Lowestoft Town F.C. players
Lowestoft Town F.C. managers

References

External links

 
Football clubs in England
Football clubs in Suffolk
Association football clubs established in 1887
1887 establishments in England
Sport in Lowestoft
Norfolk & Suffolk League
Eastern Counties Football League
Isthmian League
National League (English football) clubs
Southern Football League clubs